Events from the year 2009 in Macau, China.

Incumbents
 Chief Executive - Edmund Ho, Fernando Chui
 President of the Legislative Assembly - Susana Chou, Lau Cheok Vá

Events

June
 1 June - The opening of City of Dreams in Cotai.

July
 26 July - 2009 Macanese Chief Executive election

September
 20 September - The opening of L'Arc Casino in Sé.

December
 20 December - Fernando Chui took office as the second Chief Executive of Macau.
 26 December - The first showing of Macau International Movie Festival.

References

 
Years of the 21st century in Macau
Macau
Macau
2000s in Macau